Łada (Łady, Ładzic, Mancz) is a Polish szlachta coat of arms originating from Mazovia.

History 
The earliest mention of the coat of arms comes from court records from 1401. The earliest attestation of the seal appears in 1466 in the document of the Peace of Toruń.

The earliest heraldic source mentioning the Łada coat of arms is Insignia seu clenodia Regis et Regni Poloniae historian Jan Długosz, dated 1464-1480. He records information about the coat of arms among the 71 oldest Polish noble coats of arms in the passage: "Lada, que ex domo Accipitrum deriuationem sumpsit, deferens babatum cruce signatum et in uno cornu sagittam, in altero retortam, in campo rubeo. Lada a nomine dee Polonice, que in Mazouia in loco et in villa Lada colebatur, vocabulum sumpsit exinde.". According to Długosz it derives from Jastrzębiec family and derived the name from an alleged Polish goddess Łada worshipped in the village of Łada in Mazovia.

Blazon 
According to Długosz: red, a horseshoe argent, silver horseshoe pointing downwards, surmounted of a golden cross pattée; on the right, a silver arrow in a pale, on the left, an arrow with a pall pointing downwards; in the crest, a golden half-leaf in a crown with a sword in its right paw.

However, the Herbarz Arsenalski (c. 1535-1555) describes the coat of arms as red, a horseshoe with the caulkins pointing upwards, a cross pattée in the center, and the letters A and V above the caulkins.

According to the Herby Rycerztwa Polskiego (1584), the background was blue and the arrows were pointing upwards (III).

The version with hunting horns under the horseshoe (IV) does not appear until the 18th century on the initiative of the illustrator of Korona polska by Kasper Niesiecki, who probably used block from earlier books on coats of arms to illustrate the Łada, reworking them in various ways.

References

Bibliography 

 
 
 

Łada